Michel Host (1942 – 6 June 2021) was a French writer.

Biography

He was born in Veurne, West Flanders, Belgium. He taught school, then high school.
He lived in Paris, where he taught language and literature of the Spanish Golden Age in CNED (1996) after Hispanic studies at the Sorbonne.

He was a columnist for the literary journal Revue des deux mondes and Regards.
Co-founder of the magazine L’Art du bref in 1995, 
he received the Prix Goncourt in 1986 for his second novel, Valet de nuit (Grasset).

Host died on 6 June 2021, from COVID-19 in Paris during the COVID-19 pandemic in France.

Awards 
 2003 Grand Prize of the news of the S.G.D.L.
 1996 Book Prize in Picardy
 1986 Prix Goncourt

Bibliography 
 L'Ombre, le Fleuve, l'Eté, 1983, Éditions Grasset, prix Robert Walser 1984 (Bienne, Suisse) pour la première fois décerné à un romancier français.
 Valet de nuit, 1986, Éditions Grasset, prix Goncourt
 Les Cercles d'or, 1989, Éditions Grasset
 La Maison Traum, 1990, Éditions Grasset
 Peter Sis, l'imagier du temps, 1996, Éditions Grasset
 La Soirée, 1989 (épuisé), réédition de poche, Ed. Mille & Une Nuits, 2002, Éditions Maren Sell
 Images de l'Empire, 1991 Éditions Ramsay / De Cortanze, réédition 2001, Ed. Olympio, on line
 Forêt Forteresse, conte pour aujourd'hui, 1993, Édition La Différence
 with A. Absire, J-C. Bologne, D. Noguez, C. Pujade-Renaud, M. Winckler, D. Zimmermann : L'Affaire Grimaudi, roman, 1995, Éditions du Rocher
 Les attentions de l'enfance, 1996, Éditions Bernard Dumerchez, prix de Picardie
 Déterrages/villes, poèmes, 1997, Éditions Bernard Dumerchez
 Journal de vacances d'une chatte parisienne, 1996, Éditions La Goutte d'Eau
 Roxane, 1997, Éditions Zulma-Calmann-Lévy
 Graines de pages, proses & poèmes sur 60 photos de Claire Garate, 1999, Éditions Eboris, Genève
 Alentours, petites proses, 2001, Éditions de l'Escampette
 Regards, album, 1999, Éditions Blanc-Mesnil 2000
 Poème d'Hiroshima, oratorio, Éditions Rhubarbe, 2005
 Le petit chat de neige, Éditions Rhubarbe, 2007

References 

1942 births
2021 deaths
French male writers
People from Flemish Brabant
Prix Goncourt winners
Deaths from the COVID-19 pandemic in France